Road signs in South Korea are regulated by the Korean Road Traffic Authority.

Signs indicating dangers are triangular with a red border, yellow background and black pictograms, similar to road signs in Greece. Mandatory instructions are white on a blue background, prohibitions are black on a white background with a red border, and supplementary information signs are rectangular with black text on a white background. Like other countries, the signs use pictograms to display their meaning. Any text included in signs will normally be in Korean and English. Signs are normally placed 1 to 2.1 meters high.

South Korean road signs depict people with realistic (as opposed to stylized) silhouettes.

Road signs in South Korea closely followed Japanese and European rules on road signs until 1970s.

South Korea signed the Vienna Convention on Road Signs and Signals but has yet to ratify the Convention.

Warning signs
Warning signs are triangular with yellow backgrounds, red borders and black pictograms.

Prohibition signs
Prohibition signs are round with white backgrounds, red borders and black pictograms.

Mandatory instruction signs
Mandatory instruction signs are round with blue backgrounds and white pictograms.

Supplementary signs
Supplementary signs are rectangular with white backgrounds and black text. Most of signs are only written in Korean.

Direction and distance signs
Direction and distance signs are rectangular with dark green backgrounds and white text. In urban areas, direction signs have dark blue backgrounds. The signs are normally written in Korean and English. In March 2010, Korea Expressway Corporation introduced a new type of direction sign for expressways. Currently, Korea Expressway Corporation changes old direction signs to new ones on their expressways. This new type of direction sign is exit guide based sign and its typeface has changed from Sandol Doropyojipanche (Sandol traffic sign typeface, which can be seen on the distance sign and direction sign below) to Hangilche (Hangil typeface). It also includes motorways.

Other signs

Photographs

Characteristics 
Traffic signs in Korea shall be designated as traffic signs on the traffic sign schedule, the actual design of traffic signs installed is often different.

References

External links
 Korean Road Traffic Authority

South Korea